This is a list of detention facilities holding illegal immigrants in the United States. The United States maintains the largest illegal immigrant detention camp infrastructure in the world, which by the end of the fiscal year 2007 included 961 sites either directly owned by or contracted with the federal government, according to the Freedom of Information Act Office of the U.S. Immigration and Customs Enforcement (ICE). During the period 2007–2009, no fewer than 363 detention camps were used.

References

American Civil Liberties Union of Massachusetts. 2008. Detention and Deportation in the Age of Ice: Immigrants and Human Rights in Massachusetts. December 2008.
Corrections Corporation of America. Website. http://www.correctionscorp.com/.
Fleming, Cory and Fritz Scheuren. Study on the Asylum Seekers in Expedited Removal: Statistical Report on Detention - FY 2000 – 2003. U.S Department of Homeland Security, February 2005.
GEO Group, Inc. Website. http://www.thegeogroupinc.com/.
Pavlik-Kenan, Catrina M. (Immigration and Customs Enforcement Freedom of Information Act Office). 2007. Letter to Michael Flynn (Global Detention Project). 7 November 2007. Geneva, Switzerland.
Pioneer Human Services. Website. "Juvenile Programs, Pioneer Human Services." http://www.pioneerhumanserv.com/community_links/juvenile.html.
Southwest Key. Website. "Unaccompanied Minors Program." http://www.swkey.org/Unaccompanied_Minors.html.
U.S. Department of Health and Human Services. Website. "Office of Refugee Resettlement." http://www.acf.hhs.gov/programs/orr/.
U.S. Immigration and Customs Enforcement. Website. "Detention & Removal: Immigration Detention Facilities." http://www.ice.gov/pi/dro/facilities.htm.
Women's Refugee Commission. 2009. Halfway Home: Unaccompanied Children in Immigration Detention. February 2009.

United States

detention sites
Detention sites